Balaguer is a town in Catalonia, Spain.

Balaguer may also refer to:

People
 Asunción Balaguer (1925–2019), a Spanish actress
 David Balaguer, a Spanish handball player
 Juan Carlos Balaguer, a Spanish goalkeeper
 Joaquín Balaguer (1906–2002), former president of the Dominican Republic
 José Ramón Balaguer Cabrera (1932–2022), Cuban politic and diplomat.
 Rosa Balaguer, a Spanish gymnast

Other
 Balaguer Guitars, an American musical instrument manufacturer

Catalan-language surnames